Brigitte Bout (born 26 January 1941) represented the Pas-de-Calais department in the Senate of France from June 8, 2002 to September 30, 2011.  She is a member of the Union for a Popular Movement.

She was born Brigitte Pouille. Before being elected to the Senate, she worked as an engineer. Bout did not run for reelection to the Senate in 2011.

She served as mayor of Fleurbaix from 2001 to 2008.

In  2013, Bout was named a Chevalier in the French Legion of Honour.

References

1941 births
Living people
Union for a Popular Movement politicians
French Senators of the Fifth Republic
Place of birth missing (living people)
Chevaliers of the Légion d'honneur
Women mayors of places in France
20th-century French women politicians
21st-century French women politicians
Women members of the Senate (France)
Senators of Pas-de-Calais